Ezgi Dilik (born 12 June 1995 in Ankara, Turkey) is an Aydın Büyükşehir Belediyespor volleyball player.

Personal life

Career

Clubs
Dilik began her sports career in the youth team of Eczacıbaşı VitrA, and transferred later to Vakıfbank. Her next club became Fenerbahçe, where she played three seasons. For the last two seasons, she was loaned out to Sarıyer Belediyesi. For the 2014–15 season, she returned to her club Fenerbahçe.
In 2017–2018, she play with Eczacıbaşı VitrA again.

International
Dilik was a member of the Turkey women's national volleyball team, which won the 2014 Women's European Volleyball League.

Honours

National team
 2014 Women's European Volleyball League - 
 2015 FIVB Volleyball Women's U23 World Championship - 
 2015 Women's European Volleyball League –

Club
 2015 Turkish Super Cup -  Runner-Up, with Fenerbahçe Grundig
 2014-15 Turkish Cup -  Champion, with Fenerbahçe Grundig
 2014–15 Turkish Women's Volleyball League -  Champion, with Fenerbahçe Grundig
 2014-15 Turkish Super Cup -  Champion, with Fenerbahçe Grundig
 2016-17 Turkish Cup -  Champion, with Fenerbahçe
 2016–17 Turkish Women's Volleyball League -  Champion, with Fenerbahçe

See also
 Turkish women in sports

References

1995 births
Sportspeople from Ankara
Turkish women's volleyball players
Eczacıbaşı volleyball players
VakıfBank S.K. volleyballers
Sarıyer Belediyesi volleyballers
Fenerbahçe volleyballers
Living people
Turkey women's international volleyball players
Aydın Büyükşehir Belediyespor volleyballers